Khimik Sports Complex is located in Ivana Mazepy St, 78, Chernihiv, Chernihiv Oblast, Ukraine 14039.

General description
The sports complex "Khimik" is located nearby the Tekstylnyk stadium on an area of 4.5 hectares. It was formerly the home arena of football club Khimik Chernihiv, located also by 2–3 km from the Chernihiv Ovruch railway and the Monument to Soldiers Liberators in Victory Square. There are football fields, tennis courts; there are also large and small gyms in the room, a big gym. 4 changing rooms with toilets and showers; wood-fired sauna. The Complex offers services of sports facilities for cultural events. There are high-class table tennis and tennis sparring coaches, that can helps anyone interested in improving their skills. Football fans can rent any of the three fields of different sizes or a gym. After a good workout there is an opportunity to take a steam bath in a cozy sauna.

History
It was also the home venue of the defunct football team Khimik Chernihiv who won the Ukrainian Amateur Football Championship in 1976 and got third place twice in 1970 and in 1975. The club won the Chernihiv Oblast Football Championship 15 times. The club also won the Chernihiv Oblast Football Cup 10 times.

The tennis team of Butterfly UA held its regular rating tournament "Butterfly Cup" 2016 in the city of Chernihiv, in the reconstructed Khimik Sports Complex. In October 2017, The Championship among Cadets was held, which is one of the criteria for selection to the national teams of Ukraine for international competitions. In October 2019, the Sport Complex hosted the Young table tennis masters for a place in the national team of Chernihiv region. In September 2020 the Championship of Ukraine among regional teams (adults) in Chernihiv took place. In 2020 the Federation of Table Tennis of Ukraine organized a series of tournaments "The League of the Best" season 2020-2021!  From 28 September to 7 October 2020 a training camp of the youth and cadet national table tennis teams was held at "Yunist-Chernihiv" Sports Complex, for two-time training of national team candidates, although team travel was restricted due to the COVID-19 pandemic.

The Venue was used also by the female football club Lehenda Chernihiv, the young team academy of SDYuShOR Desna, Desna-3 Chernihiv, Desna-2 Chernihiv and Desna-3 Chernihiv. In summer 2021, FC Chernihiv, the second main team of the city of Chernihiv, used the venue for the training for the next season (2021-22) of Ukrainian Second League.

On 30 March 2022 Russians are fighting table tennis with missile and artillery weapons. Competitors are eliminated. A specialized table tennis hall in Chernihiv was hit by the Russian army. The occupiers aimed at the sports complex, but the rocket did not reach the building, leaving a funnel on the sports ground nearby. The depth of the funnel reaches about ten meters. The Khimik Sport Complex, received severe "injuries" - all the windows were broken, plaster crumbled, tables, floor, ceiling, electrical equipment were damaged. Practically, the center for table tennis became unsuitable. The Khimik-Chernihiv Sports Complex came under artillery fire several times during the fighting. More than ten shells fell on the territory of the complex, one of which formed a ten-meter funnel on the football field. The shells hit the Khimik sports hall, where a number of national tournaments were held before the Russian attack, both at the youth and adult levels. The open-air tennis court, which was hit by several mines, was also damaged. According to the employees of the sports complex, looting occurred during the siege of Chernihiv, as eight TV sets disappeared from the building.

Sports Facilities
 Soccer
 Basketball
 Tennis
 Tennis Table

See also
 List of sports venues in Chernihiv

References

External links
Vkontakte
Facebook
Instagram
tabletennis.org.ua
mixsport.pro
map.cn.ua
Youtube

Football venues in Chernihiv
Football venues in Chernihiv Oblast
Multi-purpose stadiums in Ukraine
Sports venues in Chernihiv
Sports complexes
Buildings and structures in Chernihiv
Sports venues built in the Soviet Union
Sports complexes in Ukraine
Monuments and memorials to Yuri Gagarin
Chernihiv
Sports venues in Chernihiv Oblast